Samyuktha is a 1988 Indian Kannada-language thriller film directed by K. N. Chandrashekar Sharma. The story is based on a novel of same name by Kakolu Saroja Rao. The film stars Shiva Rajkumar, Balaraj, Chi Guru Dutt and debutant actress Veena. The film was widely appreciated for its songs and story upon release. The songs composed by Singeetam Srinivasa Rao were huge hits. Singeetam also co-wrote the screenplay for this movie. The background score was composed by Shankar–Ganesh. 

In an episode in Weekend with Ramesh, Shiva Rajkumar had revealed that initially the movie was supposed to have only 2 protagonists – Chi Guru Dutt and Balaraj as in the original novel. However, he was later on board to give credibility to the project.

Plot 
Three youngsters Shivaraj aka Shivu, Balaraj aka Balu and Gururaj aka Guru arrive in Saligrama to work in a factory owned by Mohan Rao, with the influence of Home Minister. They all stay at Factory Manager Gopal Rao's house after Gopal Rao's insistence. Shivu falls for Devi, Gopal Rao's sister. They travel across the village where they learn about a desolated house, which is haunted by the ghost of Mohan Rao's deceased wife Samyuktha. They decide to investigate, but Devi disagrees with them and reveals that her brother-in-law Sadanand, who is a police inspector went towards the house to investigate, but went missing. Mohan Rao arrives from Delhi and grants them jobs where he also makes them to stay at Samyuktha's house to scare them away from the village as Mohan Rao feels that they are irresponsible persons. 

The trio shift to the bungalow and experience paranormal activities: When Balu was returning from a theatre with his girlfriend Pramila, He hears sounds of a woman singing, deducing it is a Mohini escapes from the forest to the bungalow. They also finds that someone has been following them. One night, they hear the same song where they find a woman and follows her, who tries to commit suicide, but Shivu saves her only to find that she is Devi's sister Radha, who reveals that she followed Sadanand to the bungalow, only to find him disappeared which results in Radha sinking into depression. The trio checks Samyuktha's room for clues, but to no avail. Balu wakes up to drink water, only to find a horrific ghost in front to their room. The ghost escapes making the trio deduce that someone is trying to scare them by using Ghost tactics. 

After completing their work at night, The trio are attacked by goons and manages to defeat them, but Balu gets knocked by the process. Devi arrives at the bungalow to meet the trio, only to see the ghost and escapes from there until Shivu arrives and chases the ghost. He throws a knife at the ghost where Shivu finds blood stains confirming their suspicion. At Devi's friend Shashirekha's birthday, Guru goes missing and deduce that he has been kidnapped. At morning, Shivu and Balu finds Guru's camera where they find the photo of the priest, who prays at a Gudi near the bungalow is involved in the paranormal activities. They follow him at night, but the priest sees them and a chase ensues where the priest disappears. The next morning, Shivu and Balu find the priest dead and his  body hanging from the tree. 

They deduce that the priest disappeared from the temple and at night they check the temple and finds some dotted snake puzzle and solve it which leads to a tunnel, only to find that the base is actually an illegal arms den. Shivu and Balu attack the culprits and frees Guru and Sadanand (who is alive) and also confront the ghost, who reveals that Gopal Rao is behind Samyuktha's death and arms smuggling. Samyuktha had learnt about Gopal Rao's smuggling business which leads to Gopal Rao chocking Samyuktha to death and made it look like a suicide, He only spared Sadanand as he is Radha's husband. Shivu, Balu and Guru confronts Gopal Rao, who reveal themselves as undercover officers, who are assigned by Mohan Rao to solve the case. A chase and shootout ensues at a factory where Shivu, Balu and Guru manages to catch Gopal Rao and arrest him. After this, Shivu-Devi, Balu-Pramila, Guru-Shashirekha embarks on a road trip at the hillside.

Cast 

 Shiva Rajkumar as Shivaraj aka Shivu
 Veena as Devi
 Chi Guru Dutt as Gururaj aka Guru
 Balaraj as Balaraj aka Balu
 K. S. Ashwath as Veerabhadraiah
 Sundar Krishna Urs as Mohan Rao
 Avinash as Gopal Rao
 Shivaram as Purushotthama Rao
 Honnavalli Krishna as Thamboori
 Sudha Narasimharaju as Prameela
 Prashanthi Nayak as Shashi
 Roopadevi as Samyuktha (Voice dubbed by B. Jayashree)
 Devaraj in a guest appearance as Devil
 Sadashiva Brahmavar as Priest

Soundtrack 
The soundtrack of the film was composed by Singeetam Srinivasa Rao.

Legacy
Abhiram titled his 2017 film Samyuktha 2, which has no similarity with this film.

References 

1988 films
1980s Kannada-language films
Indian thriller films
Films scored by Shankar–Ganesh
Films based on Indian novels
Films with screenplays by Chi. Udayashankar
1988 thriller films
Films scored by Singeetam Srinivasa Rao